Karakoçan ( Tepe) is a town of Elazığ Province in the Eastern Anatolia region of Turkey. It is the seat of Karakoçan District. Its population is 14,811 (2021). The mayor is Ayhan Akbaba (AKP). Karakoçan is located on a stony plain that is watered by a stream that flows to the Peri Su. It is the successor of the ancient and medieval town of Bağın, located on the Peri Su to the northwest.

Election results

Municipality elections

Municipality Elections 2019

Municipality elections of 2014

Municipality elections of 2009

Municipality elections of 2004

References

External links 
  Karakoçan Haberleri 
  Karakoçan Köyleri

Towns in Turkey
Populated places in Elazığ Province
Karakoçan District
Kurdish settlements in Elazığ Province